One Foot in the Gutter (subtitled A Treasury of Soul) is the debut album led by jazz drummer Dave Bailey which was originally released on the Epic label in 1960.

Reception

Allmusic reviewer Ken Dryden stated: "The music is consistently loose, fresh and very inspired; egos have been checked at the door as everyone aspires to work together to produce the best results... this release is strong proof that talented musicians don't have to meticulously plan out their set to produce timeless music".

Track listing 
 "One Foot in the Gutter" (Clark Terry) - 10:49   
 "Well, You Needn't" (Thelonious Monk) - 11:50   
 "Sandu" (Clifford Brown) - 20:57

Personnel 
Dave Bailey - drums
Clark Terry - trumpet, flugelhorn
Curtis Fuller - trombone
Junior Cook - tenor saxophone
Horace Parlan - piano
Peck Morrison - bass

References 

Dave Bailey (musician) albums
1960 debut albums
Epic Records albums